Curvinomia iridescens is a species of bee in the genus Curvinomia, of the family Halictidae.

References
 http://www.atlashymenoptera.net/pagetaxon.asp?tx_id=2034
 https://www.academia.edu/7390502/AN_UPDATED_CHECKLIST_OF_BEES_OF_SRI_LANKA_WITH_NEW_RECORDS

Halictidae
Hymenoptera of Asia
Insects of Sri Lanka
Insects described in 1857